John McCrea (born 10 October 1992) is a British actor and singer.  He was nominated for a Olivier Award for the role Jamie New in the coming-of-age stage musical Everybody's Talking About Jamie, and portrayed Artie in the 2021 Disney crime comedy-drama Cruella.

Personal life and education 
McCrea attended Sylvia Young Theatre School, in London. McCrea is openly gay.

Acting career
McCrea had roles in the 2017 film God's Own Country and the 2020 television series Dracula.

In the 2021 film Cruella, McCrea plays vintage fashion shop owner Artie, the first originally created openly gay character in a live-action Disney film. Additionally, he contributed to the film's soundtrack, recording a cover version of The Stooges' "I Wanna Be Your Dog" which he performs on-screen in the film.

Acting credits

Film

Television

Theatre

Accolades

See also
 List of British actors

References

External links

21st-century English male actors
English male film actors
English male television actors
21st-century English male singers
21st-century English singers
English gay actors
English gay musicians
Actors from Aldershot
Living people
1992 births
Male actors from Hampshire